is a junction passenger railway station located in the city of Fuchū, Tokyo, Japan, operated by East Japan Railway Company (JR East).

Lines
It is located 22.8 kilometers from Tsurumi Station on the Musashino Line and 27.9 kilometers from Kawasaki Station on the Nambu Line.

Station layout

The station consists of a central island platform serving two terminating tracks for the Musashino Line, with two side platforms on either side serving the Nambu Line tracks.

The station building is elevated and is located above the tracks and platforms. The station has a "Midori no Madoguchi" staffed ticket office.

Platforms

History
The station opened on 11 December 1928. The Musashino Line platforms opened on 1 April 1973. With the privatization of Japanese National Railways (JNR) on 1 April 1987, the station came under the control of JR East.

Passenger statistics
In fiscal 2019, the station was used by an average 17,126 passengers daily (boarding passengers only). The passenger figures (boarding passengers only) for previous years are as shown below.

Surrounding area
 Fuchū Station (Keio Line)
 Fuchū-Keiba-Seimon-mae Station (Keiō Keibajō Line)
 Bubaigawara Station (Nambu Line)
 Tokyo Racecourse (direct access from station via special gates on race days)
 Tamagawa Kyōtei Course (boat racing)
 Fuchū City Office
 Ōkunitama Shrine
 Anyoji Temple
 Kyodo no mori museum
 Tama River

See also
 List of railway stations in Japan

References

External links

 Fuchūhommachi Station information (JR East) 

Railway stations in Japan opened in 1928
Stations of East Japan Railway Company
Railway stations in Tokyo
Musashino Line
Fuchū, Tokyo